Qiancao is a town in Pingyuan County, Dezhou, in northwestern Shandong province, China.

References

Township-level divisions of Shandong